Yongdamcheon is a river of South Korea. It is a river of the Han River system. According to legend, an evil monster lived in the stream that terrorized the local citizens. Once the Yongdamsa Temple was built by Doseon, the monster stopped its attacks.

References

Rivers of South Korea